The Talaja Caves are located in Bhavnagar district of the Indian state of Gujarat at Talaja. The rock cuts are carved out into deserted conical rocks. The rock cut group include 30 caves among which about 15 are water tanks. The cave has unique architecture known as Ebhal Mandapa. The halls are plain. "On the facade there are chaitya windows with a broad bank below them."  The chaitya and cells were carved during Buddhism influence in 2nd century BC.

During the Kshatrapas' regime in 2nd CE Jainism emblems were carved on the cells and the halls. The caves were carved out before rock cut architecture begins in the Maharashtra. According to few Historians the date of caves can not be traced out however some believe that carving started by the end of 1st century CE.

References

Further reading
 

Buddhist caves in India
Caves of Gujarat
Indian rock-cut architecture
Former populated places in India
Buddhist pilgrimage sites in India
Buddhist temples in India
Caves containing pictograms in India
Bhavnagar district
2nd-century Jain temples
Jain rock-cut architecture
Monuments of National Importance in Gujarat